Evelyn Ryan may refer to:

 Evelyn Ryan, American housewife whose story is told in the film The Prize Winner of Defiance, Ohio
 Evelyn Ryan (Dawson's Creek), a fictional character from the WB television drama Dawson's Creek